The 3rd constituency of Seine-Saint-Denis is one of the 12 legislative constituencies in Seine-Saint-Denis (93) département, France. Like the other 576 French constituencies, it elects one MP using the two-round system.

The current boundaries of the constituency are entirely different to those that existed before the 2010 redistricting. The current boundaries are largely the same as those of the now-defunct 13th constituency.

Deputies

Election results

2022

 
 
 
 
 
 
 
 
 
|-
| colspan="8" bgcolor="#E9E9E9"|
|-

2017

 
 
 
 
 
 
 
 
|-
| colspan="8" bgcolor="#E9E9E9"|
|-

2012

 
 
 
 
 
|-
| colspan="8" bgcolor="#E9E9E9"|
|-

2007

 
 
 
 
 
 
 
 
 
|-
| colspan="8" bgcolor="#E9E9E9"|
|-

2002

 
 
 
 
 
 
|-
| colspan="8" bgcolor="#E9E9E9"|
|-

1997

 
 
 
 
 
 
|-
| colspan="8" bgcolor="#E9E9E9"|
|-

References 

3